Roger Lee Garrett (July 16, 1940 – May 23, 2000) was an American actor. He acted on stage, and played supporting roles in television series and films. He had a starring role in the West Coast production of Fortune and Men's Eyes (1969), and a starring role in the horror/thriller motion picture Night of the Cobra Woman (1972).

Some of the big name performers that Garrett appeared opposite are Elizabeth Montgomery, Barbara Eden, Larry Hagman, Don Johnson, Jacqueline Bisset, Tuesday Weld, and Jack Nicholson.

Early life
He was born in Los Angeles, California, the son of Gordon Glen Garrett (1909-1970) and Betty Zane Marshall, who were married on June 8, 1939 in Flagstaff, Arizona.

On September 8, 1962, he and Janice Conroy (born c. 1944) were married in Los Angeles. They had a daughter, Tania Garrett (born January 1, 1963).

Acting career
Garrett first appeared on television as Clyde Farnsworth, a warlock who had turned himself into an obnoxious chair because Samantha rejected him, in a 1966 episode of Bewitched. That was followed with an episode of I Dream of Jeannie.

He toured with a stage production of The Impossible Years in 1968, and was then cast by director Sal Mineo to star in the role as Mona in the West Coast premiere of the controversial gay-themed prison drama Fortune and Men's Eyes by playwright John Herbert. The show was set to open on January 9, 1969, at the Coronet Theatre on North La Cienega Boulevard. An article with stage news in the Los Angeles Times of Sunday, January 5, 1969, reads:

"Sal Mineo, now directing his first play, took the cast of John Herbert's "Fortune and Men's Eyes" which opens Thursday night at the Coronet Theater, to Chino Prison for a first hand rehearsal. The leads—Roger Garrett, Michael Greer, Don Johnson and 
James Oliver—were booked into the prison for the weekend. The idea was to see what prison atmosphere was really like."

On a website about Mineo, it says, in reference to Fortune and Men's Eyes, "The other character in the cell is Jan, or Mona, as he is called. He is a defenceless little bookworm who was persecuted by some toughs who said he made a pass so he is in the place for several months (this REALLY "cures" people of their demons, doesn't it?). It is Mona who watches Smitty's mind and spirit be turned to the "dark side" of its day. Roger Garrett was the actor who played this role. He was excellent and left a couple of months into the run to do a film—The Grasshopper, with Jacqueline Bissett and Jim Brown. Roger plays her hairdresser/confidante."

Garrett appeared in three theatrical motion pictures, playing the role as Buck Brown in the drama/romance The Grasshopper (1970) starring Jacqueline Bisset, Jim Brown, and Joseph Cotten; the role as Noah's friend in the drama A Safe Place (1971) starring Tuesday Weld, Orson Welles, and Jack Nicholson; and the role as Stan Duff opposite Joy Bang and Marlene Clark in the horror/thriller Night of the Cobra Woman (1972).

He made guest appearances on other popular TV shows, including Adam-12, The Interns, and Laverne & Shirley.

Death
Roger Garrett died at age 59, on May 23, 2000, while in Cottonwood Cove, Nevada.

Filmography

Film

TV series

References

External links 
 

1940 births
2000 deaths
American male stage actors
American male television actors
American male film actors
20th-century American male actors
Male actors from Los Angeles